State Highway 53 (SH 53) is a state highway in Adams County, Colorado, United States, north of Denver. SH 53's southern terminus is at Interstate 25 (I-25) and U.S. Route 87 (US 87) north of Denver, and the northern terminus is at SH 224 east of Westminster.

Route description
SH 53 begins at the 58th Avenue interchange (exit 215) on I-25. After a short distance west on 58th Avenue, the route turns north on Broadway Street, crossing under Interstate 76 with no access and ending at 70th Avenue (SH 224).

History
In 1971-1972, Colorado constructed an extension of Broadway Street from 66th Avenue north to SH 224, including a bridge over Clear Creek. Along with existing portions of Broadway Street and 58th Avenue, the new roadway was designated State Highway 53.

Major intersections

References

External links

053
Transportation in Adams County, Colorado